Aniversário do Tatu is the debut studio album by Brazilian music duo Sandy & Junior, released by Philips and PolyGram on 1991. The album has sonority influenced by country music and was produced by the father of the duo, the singer Xororó. Its release took place in the TV series Domingão do Faustão, of Rede Globo.

The title of the album refers to a joke with the social relations between the animals of the forest and its themes allude to the harmony of nature and the teachings that the life in the field propitiates. The biggest hits of the album were "Aniversário do Tatu" and "Maria Chiquinha" (a re-reading of the song originally released by Sonia Mamed and Evaldo Gouveia in 1961).

The album was certified gold by the Pro-Música Brasil for sales of over 100,000 copies. According to Época magazine, the album sold 230,000 copies, while Quem magazine claims that the album reached 300,000 copies sold.

Background and development
After winning a national screening at the end of 1989, during a "Maria Chiquinha" performance on the Som Brasil TV series, the brothers were invited by the label PolyGram to sign a three-album contract, which began the professional career of the young duo. Aniversário do Tatu was recorded in 1990 and its sound was influenced by the father of the pair, the sertanejo singer Xororó; he produced the album and also wrote some diverse songs; some in tandem with Noely, his wife and mother of the singers.

Track listing

Certifications and sales

References

External links 
 Aniversário do Tatu at Discogs

Sandy & Junior albums
1991 debut albums
Children's music albums by Brazilian artists
Portuguese-language albums